Jamia Imam Muhammad Anwar Shah is an Islamic seminary situated in Deoband, Saharanpur, Uttar Pradesh.

History
Jamia Imam Muhammad Anwar Shah was established by Anzar Shah Kashmiri in 1997. It is named after the Indian hadith scholar Anwar Shah Kashmiri. The Jamia follows the dars-e-nizami syllabus.

Indian poet Fuzail Ahmad Nasiri is the current Vice-Administrator of Education and Hadith professor of Jamia.

Publications
 Monthly Muhaddis-e-Asr (Urdu)

References

Deobandi Islamic universities and colleges
Educational institutions established in 1997
1997 establishments in Uttar Pradesh
Deoband